Alentejan Portuguese is a dialect of Portuguese spoken in the Portuguese region of Alentejo. It is also spoken, with its own subdialect, in the disputed municipalities of Olivença and Táliga. In this area, the language is currently endangered.

Characteristics 

 Presence of the article before the possessive pronoun, as in Ladino
 The regular use of the gerund in the present tense.
 A shift of ou to oi:  for 
 Paragoge with i added to the end of verbs in the infinitive of verbs:  for 

Present situation in Olivença and Táliga
The 2005 report of the Council of Europe's expert group on the implementation of the European Charter for Regional or Minority Languages in Spain asked the Spanish government to furnish information about the situation of Oliventine Portuguese, and for measures for the protection and promotion of that language under the provisions of Article 7 of the charter. However, in the report submitted by Spain in 2006, there are no references to Oliventine Portuguese. 

In the 2008 report issued by the Council of Europe, the following paragraphs were listed:

See also 

 Oliventine Portuguese

References

Further reading

 

Endangered Romance languages
Portuguese dialects
West Iberian languages of Spain
Languages of Portugal